William, Bill, or Billy Richards may refer to:

Sportspeople

 Dicky Richards (William Henry Matthews Richards, 1862–1903), South African cricketer
 Billy Richards (footballer, born 1874) (1874–1926), West Bromwich Albion football player
 Billy Richards (footballer, born 1878) (1878–1947), Bury FC football player, see 1903 FA Cup Final
 Billy Richards (footballer, born 1905) (1905–?), Welsh international footballer, played for Wolverhampton Wanderers and Fulham
 Will Richards (footballer) (born 1991), footballer for Shrewsbury Town F.C
 Bill Richards (rugby league), Australian rugby league footballer; see List of Sydney Roosters players
 Billy Richards (rugby union) (c. 1878–c. 1928), Australian rugby union player
 William M. Richards (1873–?), American college football player and coach

Other people
 William Richards (priest) (1643–1705), English clergyman and author
 William Richards (minister) (1749–1818), Welsh Baptist minister
 William Richards (college administrator), president of Orange County Community College, Orange County, NY
 William Richards (missionary) (1793–1847), missionary and politician in Hawaii
 William Richards (politician) (1819–?), political figure in Prince Edward Island
 William A. Richards (1849–1912), American surveyor, rancher and politician, Governor of Wyoming
 William Buell Richards (1815–1889), Canadian judge, Chief Justice of Canada
 William L. Richards (1881–?), Wisconsin State Senator
 William Trost Richards (1833–1905), American landscape artist
 William Westley Richards (1789–1865), English gunmaker
 Bill Richards (musician) (1923–1995), Canadian violinist, composer, arranger, and editor
 G. William Richards (1918–2005), American Latter-day Saint composer and organist
 William Richards (Archdeacon of Berkshire) (1643–1712)
 William Upton Richards (1811–1873), Tractarian priest in the Church of England